The North African Super Cup was an annual association football competition which was launched in 2010. It is organised by the Union of North African Football Federations. The Super Cup pits the winner of the North African Cup of Champions against the winner of the North African Cup Winners Cup.

The competition was cancelled on 2011 because of the Arab Spring revolutions. On 2015, UNAF decided to merge the North African Cup of Champions and the North African Cup Winners Cup to create the UNAF Club Cup, so the competition was abolished automatically.

Winners 

 Match between Club Africain and ES Sétif canceled.

Winners by team

Winners by country

See also
UNAF Club Cup
North African Cup of Champions
North African Cup Winners Cup

References

 
UNAF clubs competitions
Defunct international club association football competitions in Africa